Saint Demiana and the 40 Virgins (also known as the Chaste Martyr Saint Demiana) was a Coptic martyr of the early fourth century.

The story of St. Demiana
Near the end of the third century, there lived a Christian named Mark. He was the governor of el-Borollos, el-Zaafaran, and Wadi al-Saysaban districts in the Northern delta of the Nile River in Egypt.  Mark had an only child named Demiana, and her father loved her dearly. When Demiana was still a young child, her mother died, and her father did his utmost to raise her a virtuous Christian.

When she was 15, her father wanted her to marry one of his noble friends, however, she refused.  She said she had devoted herself as a bride of Christ and intended to live in celibacy and serve the Lord. Demiana requested her father to build her an isolated house on the outskirts of the city where she could live with her friends, away from the world and its temptations.

Monastic life
Her father granted her wish and built her a large palace in the wilderness.

Demiana faces the Diocletian Persecutions

When Emperor Diocletian learned that it was Mark's daughter, St. Demiana, who had persuaded her father to return to worshiping Jesus Christ, he ordered one of his commanders, who was a prince, to attack her palace with one hundred soldiers. Diocletian ordered him: “First, try to convince her to worship our idols by offering her riches and glory, but if she refuses then threaten her, torture her, and even behead her and her virgins to make her an example for the other Christians.”

Demiana saw the soldiers approaching, and prayed to God to strengthen their faith.  She told her 40 friends: “If you are willing to die for Jesus' sake then you may stay, but if you cannot withstand the torments of the soldiers then hurry and escape now.”  The forty virgins replied, “We will die with you.”

The prince relayed Diocletian's message to St. Demiana by saying: "I am an envoy sent by Emperor Diocletian.  I command you by his orders to worship his gods so that he may grant you whatsoever you wish."

St. Demiana shouted: "Cursed be to the messenger and him who sent him. ...There is no other God in heaven or on earth besides the one and only true God--the Father, the Son and the Holy Spirit--the Creator, who has no beginning and no end; the omnipresent and omniscient God who will throw you in hell for eternal condemnation.  As for me, I worship my Lord and Savior Jesus Christ, and His Good Father and the Holy Spirit--the Holy Trinity--I profess Him, ...and in His name I will die and by Him I will live forever.”

The prince was enraged with Demiana and ordered her to be placed in the Hinbazeen (squeezing press) until blood poured on the ground. When they put her in prison, an angel of the Lord appeared to her, touched her body with his illumined wings, and she was healed of all her wounds. She was subjected to additional tortures, but through it all her faith sustained her. The prince issued an order for Demiana and the 40 virgins to be beheaded. St. Demiana received 3 heavenly crowns: for her virginity, her endurance of torture and her martyrdom.

The tomb of St. Demiana and the 40 Virgins
During the reign of Constantine the Great, his mother, Helena visited the site of St. Demiana's monastery palace, where she had a church built over the tomb. This tomb church was consecrated by Pope Alexandros (Pope of Alexandria and 19th Coptic Orthodox Patriarch of the See of St. Mark), on May 20, Bashans 12 (Coptic calendar).

The original church was eventually destroyed but another has been rebuilt and still stands on the very same site to this day. Every year, many people visit St. Demiana's shrine, asking for her intercessions. The main season of visit is the period between 4th to 12th Bashans. (12–20 May).

Restoration of St. Demiana’s monastery

Situated in Barrary-Belqas, Egypt, at the same place where St. Demiana's original monastery palace and Tomb Church were, is a coenobitic Coptic Orthodox Monastery for nuns bearing her name—St. Demiana's Monastery.  The monastery was officially consecrated as a coenobitic Coptic Orthodox Monastery for Nuns on September 24, 1978, by Shenouda III, Pope of Alexandria and 117th Coptic Orthodox Patriarch of the See of St. Mark.

Presently at her monastery property, 4 of the 9 churches bear her name: Saint Demiana's Big Church, Saint Demiana's Tomb Church, Saint Demiana's Ancient Church and Saint Demiana's Church for Nuns.  Many churches of the Coptic Orthodox Church also bear her name.

In May 2014 Egyptian security forces averted a car bomb attack on the monastery.

St. Demiana, the founder of monasticism for Coptic Orthodox nuns
St. Demiana is the founder of monasticism for Coptic Orthodox nuns and the princess (highest ranking) of female martyrs of the Coptic Orthodox Church.  St. Demiana and her 40 virgin nuns are depicted in Coptic icons as not wearing the black monastic habit as we see Coptic Orthodox nuns wear nowadays because at her time, the black monastic habit had not yet taken form.

According to the Greek Orthodox Metropolitan Pentalimon Lambadarios of Pelusium, Saint Demiana has been added as a Greek Orthodox saint, and biographied in the Synaxarium of the Greek Orthodox Church.

Feasts of St. Demiana and the 40 Virgins

The Coptic Orthodox Church commemorates the feasts of St. Demiana and the 40 virgins’ martyrdom on January 21, Tooba 13 (Coptic calendar), and the consecration of Saint Demiana's Big Church at her monastery on May 20, Bashans 12 (Coptic calendar).

Primary sources
The Life Story of Saint Demiana and the 40 Virgins is found in two Arabic sources: Synaxarium and Life Story of the Chaste Saint Demiana and History of the Monastery.  The life story was translated from Arabic into English by the nuns of Saint Demiana's Monastery in Egypt. The book, Life Story of the Chaste Saint Demiana and History of the Monastery, is taken from 18th century manuscripts written by Bishop John (Bishop of El-Borollos); these manuscripts were transcribed from older manuscripts dated in the 6th century during the apostolic service of Dimianos (563-598 A.D., 35th Patriarch of the See of St. Mark), and were originally transcribed from ancient manuscripts written by Christodoulou, the disciple of Saint Julius El-Akfahsee (4th century).

Saint Demiana is the founder of monasticism for Coptic Orthodox nuns and the highest ranking female martyr of the Coptic Orthodox Church due to her forbearance of great persecution, torture and suffering.

https://st-takla.org/books/en/church/synaxarium/05-topah/13-toba-demiana.html

References

 Commemorations for Toba 13  at the Coptic Orthodox Church Network
 John, Peter, and Michael. The Synaxarium. Vol. 2. Trans. Nuns of Saint Demiana's Monastery. Cairo, Egypt: El-Mahaba Publisher, 1972. Print. pp. 167–170.
 Saint Demiana's Monastery for Nuns.  Life Story of the Chaste Saint Demiana and History of the Monastery. Trans. Nuns of Saint Demiana's Monastery.  Barrary-Belqas, Egypt: Saint Demiana's Monastery for Nuns, 2005. Print. pp. 10–57.

External links
 Kamel, Bishoy. Saint Demiana, 2009

3rd-century births
4th-century deaths
4th-century Christian martyrs
4th-century Christian saints
Burials at the Church of the Holy Virgin (Babylon El-Darag)
Saints from Roman Egypt
Late Ancient Christian female saints
Angelic visionaries
Christians martyred during the reign of Diocletian
Coptic Orthodox saints